WKS Śląsk Wrocław is a Polish basketball club based in Wrocław. Founded in 1948, Śląsk is the most decorated Polish basketball club, with 18 Polish League and 14 Polish cup championships. The club plays in the Polish Basketball League (PLK), the highest-tier level in Polish men's basketball. The home court is Hala Orbita.

History
Since the basketball section was founded in 1948, Śląsk Wrocław has been the most decorated and most recognizable club in Polish basketball. The team has won the Polish league championships 18 times so far. Most recognized period of Śląsk's history is the "Great Śląsk Era" when the team won five championship titles in a row (1998-2002). 

Most of those successes where achieved with coach Andrej Urlep. The notable players playing for Śląsk Wrocław over the years were: Mieczysław Łopatka (1960s), Edward Jurkiewicz (1970s and 1980s), Jerzy Binkowski (1980s, 1990s), Dariusz Zelig (1980s, 1990s), Maciej Zieliński (1980s, 1990s, 2000s), Adam Wójcik and Dominik Tomczyk. 

In 2008 the club has gone into serious financial difficulties, which resulted in withdrawing the team from Polish Basketball League. After years of rebuilding attempts, the club is now back playing in the Polish Basketball League top division. 

In the 2020–21 PLK season, the team finished third. Śląsk defeated Legia Warszawa 86:85 in overtime of the decisive game 3 of the bronze medal series. The result exceeded expectations as it was the club's first league podium finish in 11 years. Key players of that team included Aleksander Dziewa, Kyle Gibson, Elijah Stewart and Strahinja Jovanović.

The following season the club returned to the top of the domestic competition becoming Polish champions, twenty years after the last championship won in 2002. Travis Trice won MVP awards for both the regular season and the finals.

Season by season (since 1990)

Players

Current roster

Retired numbers

Notable players

Achievements 

 Polish League (18): 
Winner (18): 1965, 1970, 1977, 1979, 1980, 1981, 1987, 1991, 1992, 1993, 1994, 1996, 1998, 1999, 2000, 2001, 2002, 2022
 Runners-up (6): 1963, 1964, 1972, 1978, 1989, 2004
 Third place (15): 1960, 1966, 1967, 1969, 1971, 1973, 1974, 1982, 1985, 1986, 1990, 2003, 2007, 2008, 2021
1 Liga (1):
Winner (1): 2012–13
 Polish Cup (14):
 1957, 1959, 1972, 1973, 1977, 1980, 1989, 1990, 1992, 1997, 2004, 2005, 2014
 Polish Supercup  (2):
 1999, 2000

See also 
 Śląsk Wrocław
 Śląsk Wrocław (handball)

References

External links
Official site

 
Śląsk Wrocław
Basketball teams in Poland
Basketball teams established in 1948
1947 establishments in Poland